Tsagaan (Mongolian: цагаан, white) may refer to:

People 
 Monguor people or Tsagaan mongghol, a Mongol ethnic group in China
 Okna Tsahan Zam (born 1957), a Kalmyk throat singer
 Chagaan, 13th-century commander of the Mongol Empire

Places in Mongolia
 Baatsagaan, Bayankhongor
 Bayantsagaan, Bayankhongor
 Bayantsagaan, Töv
 Buutsagaan, Bayankhongor
 Erdenetsagaan, Sükhbaatar
 Saintsagaan, Dundgovi 
 Tsagaanchuluut, Zavkhan 
 Tsagaandelger, Dundgovi
 Tsagaankhairkhan, Uvs
 Tsagaankhairkhan, Zavkhan
 Tsagaan-Ovoo, Dornod
 Tsagaan-Uul, Khövsgöl 
 Tsagaan-Üür, Khövsgöl

Others 
 Tsagaan Sar, the Mongolian New Year festival
 Tsaagan, the dinosaur Tsaagan mangas (technically a misspelling)
 Tsagaannuur (disambiguation)